This is a list of members of Parliament elected to the Parliament of the United Kingdom at the 1959 general election, held on 8 October 1959.

Notable newcomers to the House of Commons included Margaret Thatcher, Nicholas Ridley, Jim Prior, Peter Tapsell, John Morris and Jeremy Thorpe. It was also the final election in which Winston Churchill, then aged 84, stood as a candidate. Tapsell retired from Parliament 56 years later, at the 2015 general election.

Composition
These representative diagrams show the composition of the parties at the 1959 general election.

Note: This is not the official seating plan of the House of Commons, which has five rows of benches on each side, with the government party to the right of the Speaker and opposition parties to the left, but with room for only around two-thirds of MPs to sit at any one time.

By-elections
See the list of United Kingdom by-elections.

By region 

 List of MPs for constituencies in Scotland (1959–1964)

See also
List of parliaments of the United Kingdom
UK general election, 1959
:Category:UK MPs 1959-1964

1959
1959 United Kingdom general election
 List
UK MPs